"Ballin" is a song by American rapper Juicy J featuring fellow American rapper Kanye West. released as a single on September 28, 2016.

Background
On September 23, 2016, five days belong the single was released, Juicy announced via Twitter that a viewing party would be available on TIDAL, which was streamed two days before its release. The track was supposed to be part of Juicy's fourth studio album Rubba Band Business, but didn't end up on the tracklist when the album was released in December 2017.

Composition
For both the intro and outro of "Ballin", a sample of "I'm Not Gonna Give Up" by Eddie Holman is used. West's feature is minimal, since he only sings the chorus and Juicy J raps all of the verses.

Music video
On September 29, 2016, one day after the song's release, the official music video for it was released. This video was recorded with the two rappers being in a warehouse together.

Release history

References

External links

2016 songs
Juicy J songs
Kanye West songs
Song recordings produced by Cubeatz
Songs written by Juicy J
Songs written by Kanye West
Songs written by TM88
Songs written by LunchMoney Lewis
Songs written by Kevin Gomringer
Songs written by Tim Gomringer
Kemosabe Records singles
Columbia Records singles